The Canon VT is a rangefinder camera released by Canon in 1956. Until then, Canon had a history of making slightly modified Leica copies.  The release of the VT showed for the first time that Canon could be a leader in 35mm rangefinder design.

Canon kept the Leica screw mount on the VT, and little else.  They changed the film advance from a top-mounted knob to a bottom-mounted trigger.  The tripod socket was moved to mount a trigger wind grip.  They added a swing-open back making the camera easier to load than previous bottom loading Canons.

The VT had a focal-plane shutter with a cloth curtain; shutter speeds were from 1s to 1/1000, plus T and B.  Available Canon lenses ranged from 25mm to 800mm, with some as fast as f/1.2. FP, M, and X flash synchronisation was supported.

It had a three-position viewfinder with rotating prisms, which could be set to 35mm, 50mm and RF.  In the RF setting, accessory shoe-mounted viewfinders with automatic parallax correction would be used.

See also
Canon 39mm screw lenses

External links
 Cameraquest's Canon VT page
 A Canon VT page in a Leica-history site
 Canon 50/1.2 lens with discussion of the VT, by Davidde Stella. (Via Wayback, therefore slow. Choice of this particular Wayback image is arbitrary. The original URL is http://www.davidde.com/articles/canon5012.html .)
Canon VT at Sylvain Halgand's  www.collection-appareils.fr

Canon rangefinder cameras